The Swansea Bay area of Wales is located north of the sea area of Swansea Bay.  The term Swansea Bay is used by the Welsh Government for policy planning purposes as well as by a number of other organisations.

The boundaries of Swansea Bay are defined in the Welsh Assembly Government's Spatial Plan Data Project.  In the Wales Spatial Plan, Swansea Bay includes all of the unitary authorities of Swansea and Neath Port Talbot and parts of Carmarthenshire, Powys and Bridgend county borough.  The area is also a travel to work area, which was defined in 2007.  The Wales Spatial Plan identifies twenty-one key settlements in the area:

The population in the region as of 2007 is approximately 561,900.

Development areas
Welsh Assembly Government supported developments:
Baglan Energy Park
Coed Darcy
Crosshands Business Park
Felindre
Llanelli Waterside
SA1 Swansea Waterfront
Swansea city centre
Swansea Vale

Swansea Bay city region

The whole of Swansea Bay was being touted as a future city region that would have the city of Swansea as its focus but also include the urban settlements contiguous to Swansea; these would be Llanelli, Neath, Port Talbot, Ystradgynlais and Ammanford. The predicted size of this new city region is around 700,000 people who would live within 30 minutes drive from the centre of Swansea.

Following a Welsh Government commissioned report recommending the creation of the city region in July 2012, the Swansea Bay city region was established on 18 July 2013.  The city region would include the local authorities of Pembrokeshire, Carmarthenshire, Neath Port Talbot and Swansea.  Sir Terry Matthews has been appointed chairman of the Swansea Bay City Region Board.

References

External links 
Welsh Assembly Government: Swansea Bay
Swansea Bay spatial plan area
Swansea Bay: The Waterfront and Western Valleys
Swansea Bay Futures
Sustainable Regeneration Framework Swansea Bay: The Waterfront and Western Valleys Spatial Plan Area
Swansea Bay Partnership
Welsh Assembly Government Data for Swansea Bay
Swansea Bay, Mumbles and Gower
One Big Garden
Tourism Swansea Bay

 
Swansea Bay City Region